Peter Jonathan Kirkham (born 28 October 1974) is an English former footballer who played as a winger in the Football League for Darlington.

Life and career
Kirkham was born in Newcastle upon Tyne, and began his career as a youngster with Newcastle United. He never played first-team football for Newcastle, and moved on to Darlington in 1993. He made his senior debut on 2 November 1993, in the starting eleven for the Third Division match at home to Colchester United. Darlington won 7–3, and Kirkham made nine more appearances that season, mainly as a substitute. He played in six matches in 1994–95, and left the club at the end of that season.

Kirkham played in Sweden for Köping FF, and also played non-league football for teams including Gretna, Blyth Spartans, South Shields, Grantham Town, Chester-le-Street Town, Dunston Federation Brewery, Jarrowfor whom he scored the decisive penalty in the shoot-out that won the club's first ever Wearside League trophy, the Shipowners' Charity Cup, in 1995Hebburn Town, Consett, Whitley Bay, and Washington.

He returned to Jarrow in 2006, was assistant manager to Davy Bell by 2010, and took over as player-manager with Bell becoming his assistant. Kirkham played until at least 2013, and in January 2016, he again became Bell's assistant when the latter returned to Jarrow as manager.

References

1974 births
Living people
Footballers from Newcastle upon Tyne
English footballers
Association football wingers
Newcastle United F.C. players
Darlington F.C. players
MD FF Köping players
Gretna F.C. players
Blyth Spartans A.F.C. players
South Shields F.C. (1974) players
Grantham Town F.C. players
Chester-le-Street Town F.C. players
Dunston UTS F.C. players
Jarrow F.C. players
Hebburn Town F.C. players
Consett A.F.C. players
Whitley Bay F.C. players
Washington F.C. players
English Football League players
Northern Football League players
English football managers
Jarrow F.C. managers
English expatriate footballers
English expatriate sportspeople in Sweden
Expatriate footballers in Sweden